Sterane (cyclopentanoperhydrophenanthrenes) compounds are a class of tetracyclic compounds derived from steroids or sterols via diagenetic and catagenetic degradation and hydrogenation. Steranes have an androstane skeleton with a side chain at carbon C-17. The sterane structure constitutes the core of all sterols. Steranes are sometimes used as biomarkers for the presence of eukaryotic cells.

Steranes may be rearranged to diasteranes during diagenesis (C-27 to C-30, rearrangement at C-18 and C-19, no R at C-24). Oils from clastic source rocks tend to be rich in diasteranes.

Cholesterol and its derivatives (such as progesterone, aldosterone, cortisol, and testosterone), are common examples of compounds with the cyclopentanoperhydrophenanthrene nucleus.

See also
 Cholestane

References

Steroids
Cholestanes